Shariatpur-1 is a constituency represented in the Jatiya Sangsad (National Parliament) of Bangladesh since 2019 by Iqbal Hossain Apu of the Awami League.

Boundaries 
The constituency encompasses Shariatpur Sadar and Zanjira upazilas.

History 
The constituency was created in 1984 from the Faridpur-14 constituency when the former Faridpur District was split into five districts: Rajbari, Faridpur, Gopalganj, Madaripur, and Shariatpur.

Members of Parliament

Elections

Elections in the 2010s 
B. M. Muzammel Haque was re-elected unopposed in the 2014 general election after opposition parties withdrew their candidacies in a boycott of the election.

Elections in the 2000s

Elections in the 1990s 
Abdur Razzak stood for two seats in the June 1996 general election, and won both of them: Shariatpur-1 and Shariatpur-3. He chose to represent Shariatpur-3 and quit Shariatpur-1, triggering a by-election. Master Majibur Rahman, of the Awami League, was elected in a September 1996 by-election.

References

External links
 

Parliamentary constituencies in Bangladesh
Shariatpur District